The 2008–09 Golden State Warriors season was the 63rd season of the franchise in the National Basketball Association (NBA), and its 47th in the San Francisco Bay Area.

Draft picks

Regular season

Standings

Record vs. opponents

Game log

|- bgcolor="#ffcccc"
| 1
| October 29
| New Orleans
| 
| Corey Maggette (27)
| Andris Biedriņš (12)
| Stephen Jackson (5)
| Oracle Arena19,128
| 0–1
|- bgcolor="#ffcccc"
| 2
| October 31
| @ Toronto
| 
| Al Harrington (26)
| Andris Biedriņš (13)
| Stephen Jackson (5)
| Air Canada Centre19,800
| 0–2

|- bgcolor="#bbffbb"
| 3
| November 1
| @ New Jersey
| 
| Jackson, Biedriņš (23)
| Andris Biedriņš (11)
| Stephen Jackson (8)
| Izod Center17,390
| 1–2
|- bgcolor="#ffcccc"
| 4
| November 3
| @ Memphis
| 
| Stephen Jackson (17)
| Andris Biedriņš (22)
| Stephen Jackson (5)
| FedExForum10,121
| 1–3
|- bgcolor="#bbffbb"
| 5
| November 5
| Denver
| 
| Stephen Jackson (29)
| Brandan Wright (13)
| Stephen Jackson (7)
| Oracle Arena18,194
| 2–3
|- bgcolor="#ffcccc"
| 6
| November 7
| Memphis
| 
| Stephen Jackson (27)
| Andris Biedriņš (12)
| C. J. Watson (8)
| Oracle Arena18,744
| 2–4
|- bgcolor="#ffcccc"
| 7
| November 9
| @ Sacramento
| 
| Andris Biedriņš (16)
| Andris Biedriņš (18)
| Stephen Jackson (6)
| ARCO Arena12,090
| 2–5
|- bgcolor="#bbffbb"
| 8
| November 11
| Minnesota
| 
| Stephen Jackson (30)
| Andris Biedriņš (15)
| Stephen Jackson (5)
| Oracle Arena17,422
| 3–5
|- bgcolor="#ffcccc"
| 9
| November 13
| Detroit
| 
| Watson, Biedriņš (17)
| Andris Biedriņš (19)
| Stephen Jackson (9)
| Oracle Arena18,477
| 3–6
|- bgcolor="#bbffbb"
| 10
| November 15
| @ L.A. Clippers
| 
| Anthony Morrow (37)
| Andris Biedriņš (16)
| Stephen Jackson (10)
| Staples Center12,823
| 4–6
|- bgcolor="#bbffbb"
| 11
| November 18
| Portland
| 
| Anthony Morrow (25)
| Andris Biedriņš (9)
| Stephen Jackson (8)
| Oracle Arena18,284
| 5–6
|- bgcolor="#ffcccc"
| 12
| November 21
| Chicago
| 
| Stephen Jackson (32)
| Andris Biedriņš (10)
| Jackson, Watson (6)
| Oracle Arena19,596
| 5–7
|- bgcolor="#ffcccc"
| 13
| November 23
| @ Philadelphia
| 
| Kelenna Azubuike (16)
| Andris Biedriņš (8)
| Stephen Jackson (7)
| Wachovia Center13,556
| 5–8
|- bgcolor="#ffcccc"
| 14
| November 25
| @ Washington
| 
| Corey Maggette (17)
| Andris Biedriņš (9)
| Stephen Jackson (8)
| Verizon Center13,852
| 5–9
|- bgcolor="#ffcccc"
| 15
| November 26
| @ Boston
| 
| Corey Maggette (32)
| Andris Biedriņš (9)
| Jackson, Crawford (6)
| TD Banknorth Garden18,624
| 5–10
|- bgcolor="#ffcccc"
| 16
| November 28
| @ Cleveland
| 
| C. J. Watson (17)
| Randolph, Biedriņš (7)
| Jamal Crawford (6)
| Quicken Loans Arena20,562
| 5–11
|- bgcolor="#ffcccc"
| 17
| November 29
| @ New York
| 
| Corey Maggette (32)
| Corey Maggette (12)
| Watson, Crawford (5)
| Madison Square Garden19,317
| 5–12

|- bgcolor="#ffcccc"
| 18
| December 1
| Miami
| 
| Jamal Crawford (40)
| Andris Biedriņš (15)
| Stephen Jackson (11)
| Oracle Arena18,723
| 5–13
|- bgcolor="#ffcccc"
| 19
| December 5
| @ Houston
| 
| Stephen Jackson (26)
| Corey Maggette (10)
| Stephen Jackson (5)
| Toyota Center14,438
| 5–14
|- bgcolor="#ffcccc"
| 20
| December 6
| @ San Antonio
| 
| Brandan Wright (13)
| Andris Biedriņš (8)
| Ronny Turiaf (4)
| AT&T Center17,740
| 5–15
|- bgcolor="#bbffbb"
| 21
| December 8
| @ Oklahoma City
| 
| Jamal Crawford (19)
| Andris Biedriņš (21)
| Jamal Crawford (6)
| Ford Center17,854
| 6–15
|- bgcolor="#bbffbb"
| 22
| December 10
| Milwaukee
| 
| Stephen Jackson (21)
| Andris Biedriņš (14)
| Stephen Jackson (8)
| Oracle Arena18,375
| 7–15
|- bgcolor="#ffcccc"
| 23
| December 12
| Houston
| 
| Andris Biedriņš (18)
| Andris Biedriņš (12)
| Stephen Jackson (5)
| Oracle Arena19,276
| 7–16
|- bgcolor="#ffcccc"
| 24
| December 13
| @ Denver
| 
| Jamal Crawford (25)
| Kurz, Biedriņš (7)
| Stephen Jackson (5)
| Pepsi Center15,322
| 7–17
|- bgcolor="#ffcccc"
| 25
| December 15
| Orlando
| 
| Andris Biedriņš (23)
| Kelenna Azubuike (10)
| Belinelli, Crawford (6)
| Oracle Arena18,844
| 7–18
|- bgcolor="#ffcccc"
| 26
| December 17
| @ Indiana
| 
| Jamal Crawford (29)
| Andris Biedriņš (10)
| 3 players tied (4)
| Conseco Fieldhouse11,151
| 7–19
|- bgcolor="#ffcccc"
| 27
| December 19
| @ Atlanta
| 
| Marco Belinelli (27)
| Andris Biedriņš (15)
| Belinelli, Biedriņš (6)
| Philips Arena16,768
| 7–20
|- bgcolor="#bbffbb"
| 28
| December 20
| @ Charlotte
| 
| Jamal Crawford (50)
| Kelenna Azubuike (13)
| Crawford, Turiaf (5)
| Time Warner Cable Arena13,068
| 8–20
|- bgcolor="#ffcccc"
| 29
| December 22
| @ Orlando
| 
| Jamal Crawford (18)
| Anthony Randolph (12)
| Andris Biedriņš (5)
| Amway Arena17,461
| 8–21
|- bgcolor="#ffcccc"
| 30
| December 23
| @ Miami
| 
| C. J. Watson (18)
| Azubuike, Biedriņš (9)
| Azubuike, Belinelli (3)
| American Airlines Arena17,862
| 8–22
|- bgcolor="#bbffbb"
| 31
| December 26
| Boston
| 
| Stephen Jackson (28)
| Ronny Turiaf (8)
| Jackson, Belinelli (4)
| Oracle Arena19,596
| 9–22
|- bgcolor="#ffcccc"
| 32
| December 28
| @ L.A. Lakers
| 
| Jamal Crawford (22)
| Andris Biedriņš (17)
| Crawford, Jackson (5)
| Staples Center18,997
| 9–23
|- bgcolor="#bbffbb"
| 33
| December 29
| Toronto
| 
| Stephen Jackson (30)
| Andris Biedriņš (15)
| Jackson, Crawford (7)
| Oracle Arena19,596
| 10–23
|- bgcolor="#ffcccc"
| 34
| December 31
| @ Oklahoma City
| 
| Kelenna Azubuike (24)
| Andris Biedriņš (13)
| Stephen Jackson (9)
| Ford Center18,229
| 10–24

|- bgcolor="#ffcccc"
| 35
| January 2
| @ Minnesota
| 
| Stephen Jackson (25)
| Andris Biedriņš (13)
| Stephen Jackson (7)
| Target Center11,921
| 10–25
|- bgcolor="#ffcccc"
| 36
| January 5
| @ Utah
| 
| Jamal Crawford (28)
| Andris Biedriņš (17)
| Jamal Crawford (6)
| EnergySolutions Arena19,911
| 10–26
|- bgcolor="#ffcccc"
| 37
| January 7
| L.A. Lakers
| 
| Jamal Crawford (25)
| Andris Biedriņš (17)
| Jamal Crawford (9)
| Oracle Arena19,596
| 10–27
|- bgcolor="#ffcccc"
| 38
| January 10
| @ Portland
| 
| Corey Maggette (25)
| Biedriņš, Turiaf (6)
| Ronny Turiaf (7)
| Rose Garden20,687
| 10–28
|- bgcolor="#bbffbb"
| 39
| January 11
| Indiana
| 
| Jamal Crawford (32)
| Andris Biedriņš (9)
| 3 players tied (5)
| Oracle Arena18,262
| 11–28
|- bgcolor="#ffcccc"
| 40
| January 14
| Sacramento
| 
| Jamal Crawford (35)
| Andris Biedriņš (14)
| C. J. Watson (6)
| Oracle Arena19,122
| 11–29
|- bgcolor="#bbffbb"
| 41
| January 16
| Atlanta
| 
| Jamal Crawford (29)
| Corey Maggette (16)
| Stephen Jackson (6)
| Oracle Arena18,832
| 12–29
|- bgcolor="#bbffbb"
| 42
| January 19
| Washington
| 
| Jamal Crawford (28)
| Andris Biedriņš (15)
| Jamal Crawford (8)
| Oracle Arena19,244
| 13–29
|- bgcolor="#ffcccc"
| 43
| January 21
| Oklahoma City
| 
| Stephen Jackson (29)
| Jamal Crawford (7)
| Ronny Turiaf (8)
| Oracle Arena19,318
| 13–30
|- bgcolor="#ffcccc"
| 44
| January 23
| Cleveland
| 
| Stephen Jackson (24)
| Andris Biedriņš (13)
| Stephen Jackson (8)
| Oracle Arena19,596
| 13–31
|- bgcolor="#bbffbb"
| 45
| January 25
| L.A. Clippers
| 
| Corey Maggette (20)
| Andris Biedriņš (14)
| Azubuike, Jackson (6)
| Oracle Arena17,746
| 14–31
|- bgcolor="#ffcccc"
| 46
| January 28
| @ Dallas
| 
| Stephen Jackson (25)
| Andris Biedriņš (11)
| 3 players tied (3)
| American Airlines Center19,864
| 14–32
|- bgcolor="#bbffbb"
| 47
| January 30
| @ New Orleans
| 
| Corey Maggette (19)
| Ronny Turiaf (11)
| Stephen Jackson (7)
| New Orleans Arena17,738
| 15–32
|- bgcolor="#ffcccc"
| 48
| January 31
| @ Houston
| 
| Corey Maggette (17)
| Ronny Turiaf (10)
| Stephen Jackson (5)
| Toyota Center16,702
| 15–33

|- bgcolor="#ffcccc"
| 49
| February 2
| San Antonio
| 
| Stephen Jackson (33)
| Andris Biedriņš (9)
| Stephen Jackson (11)
| Oracle Arena18,205
| 15–34
|- bgcolor="#bbffbb"
| 50
| February 4
| Phoenix
| 
| Stephen Jackson (30)
| Stephen Jackson (11)
| Stephen Jackson (10)
| Oracle Arena19,596
| 16–34
|- bgcolor="#ffcccc"
| 51
| February 6
| @ Phoenix
| 
| Corey Maggette (25)
| Andris Biedriņš (11)
| Jackson, Crawford (6)
| US Airways Center18,422
| 16–35
|- bgcolor="#bbffbb"
| 52
| February 8
| Utah
| 
| Corey Maggette (24)
| Stephen Jackson (10)
| Stephen Jackson (8)
| Oracle Arena19,174
| 17–35
|- bgcolor="#bbffbb"
| 53
| February 10
| New York
| 
| Stephen Jackson (35)
| Kelenna Azubuike (10)
| Stephen Jackson (10)
| Oracle Arena19,098
| 18–35
|- bgcolor="#bbffbb"
| 54
| February 12
| Portland
| 
| Corey Maggette (24)
| Ronny Turiaf (11)
| Stephen Jackson (6)
| Oracle Arena19,322
| 19–35
|- bgcolor="#ffcccc"
| 55
| February 18
| L.A. Lakers
| 
| Jackson, Maggette (24)
| Anthony Randolph (12)
| Stephen Jackson (9)
| Oracle Arena20,007
| 19–36
|- bgcolor="#bbffbb"
| 56
| February 21
| Oklahoma City
| 
| Stephen Jackson (26)
| Corey Maggette (8)
| Stephen Jackson (9)
| Oracle Arena19,108
| 20–36
|- bgcolor="#ffcccc"
| 57
| February 23
| @ L.A. Clippers
| 
| Stephen Jackson (28)
| Maggette, Turiaf (7)
| Marco Belinelli (5)
| Staples Center15,383
| 20–37
|- bgcolor="#ffcccc"
| 58
| February 27
| Charlotte
| 
| Stephen Jackson (33)
| Andris Biedriņš (13)
| Stephen Jackson (8)
| Oracle Arena18,653
| 20–38

|- bgcolor="#ffcccc"
| 59
| March 1
| Utah
| 
| Corey Maggette (27)
| Andris Biedriņš (12)
| C. J. Watson (5)
| Oracle Arena18,347
| 20–39
|- bgcolor="#bbffbb"
| 60
| March 3
| @ Minnesota
| 
| Stephen Jackson (23)
| Andris Biedriņš (13)
| Stephen Jackson (6)
| Target Center14,780
| 21–39
|- bgcolor="#ffcccc"
| 61
| March 4
| @ Chicago
| 
| Stephen Jackson (19)
| Anthony Randolph (10)
| Stephen Jackson (6)
| United Center20,108
| 21–40
|- bgcolor="#ffcccc"
| 62
| March 6
| @ Detroit
| 
| Jamal Crawford (25)
| Jermareo Davidson (10)
| Jamal Crawford (8)
| The Palace of Auburn Hills22,076
| 21–41
|- bgcolor="#ffcccc"
| 63
| March 7
| @ Milwaukee
| 
| Jamal Crawford (32)
| Anthony Randolph (8)
| Stephen Jackson (11)
| Bradley Center15,569
| 21–42
|- bgcolor="#bbffbb"
| 64
| March 11
| New Jersey
| 
| Stephen Jackson (29)
| Andris Biedriņš (13)
| Stephen Jackson (7)
| Oracle Arena18,203
| 22–42
|- bgcolor="#bbffbb"
| 65
| March 13
| Dallas
| 
| Stephen Jackson (31)
| Ronny Turiaf (12)
| Stephen Jackson (10)
| Oracle Arena18,751
| 23–42
|- bgcolor="#ffcccc"
| 66
| March 15
| Phoenix
| 
| Monta Ellis (26)
| Randolph, Turiaf (6)
| Stephen Jackson (9)
| Oracle Arena19,596
| 23–43
|- bgcolor="#bbffbb"
| 67
| March 17
| L.A. Clippers
| 
| Monta Ellis (29)
| Kelenna Azubuike (9)
| Ronny Turiaf (8)
| Oracle Arena18,223
| 24–43
|- bgcolor="#ffcccc"
| 68
| March 19
| @ L.A. Lakers
| 
| Monta Ellis (27)
| Brandan Wright (10)
| Corey Maggette (7)
| Staples Center18,997
| 24–44
|- bgcolor="#bbffbb"
| 69
| March 20
| Philadelphia
| 
| Brandan Wright (25)
| Stephen Jackson (10)
| Stephen Jackson (9)
| Oracle Arena19,596
| 25–44
|- bgcolor="#ffcccc"
| 70
| March 22
| @ New Orleans
| 
| Stephen Jackson (22)
| Stephen Jackson (10)
| Stephen Jackson (5)
| New Orleans Arena16,351
| 25–45
|- bgcolor="#ffcccc"
| 71
| March 24
| @ San Antonio
| 
| Monta Ellis (27)
| Anthony Randolph (9)
| Stephen Jackson (4)
| AT&T Center18,797
| 25–46
|- bgcolor="#ffcccc"
| 72
| March 25
| @ Dallas
| 
| Anthony Morrow (29)
| Anthony Randolph (6)
| Ellis, Jackson (5)
| American Airlines Center19,862
| 25–47
|- bgcolor="#ffcccc"
| 73
| March 28
| @ Denver
| 
| Jamal Crawford (30)
| Anthony Randolph (14)
| Jamal Crawford (5)
| Pepsi Center19,155
| 25–48
|- bgcolor="#ffcccc"
| 74
| March 30
| Memphis
| 
| Monta Ellis (29)
| Anthony Randolph (12)
| Monta Ellis (5)
| Oracle Arena18,471
| 25–49

|- bgcolor="#bbffbb"
| 75
| April 1
| Sacramento
| 
| Monta Ellis (42)
| Azubuike, Turiaf (13)
| Monta Ellis (9)
| Oracle Arena18,743
| 26–49
|- bgcolor="#bbffbb"
| 76
| April 3
| New Orleans
| 
| Jamal Crawford (39)
| Anthony Randolph (15)
| Ronny Turiaf (6)
| Oracle Arena19,596
| 27–49
|- bgcolor="#bbffbb"
| 77
| April 5
| @ Sacramento
| 
| Kelenna Azubuike (30)
| Kelenna Azubuike (15)
| C. J. Watson (6)
| ARCO Arena12,975
| 28–49
|- bgcolor="#ffcccc"
| 78
| April 8
| Minnesota
| 
| Jamal Crawford (31)
| Anthony Randolph (11)
| Ronny Turiaf (6)
| Oracle Arena18,808
| 28–50
|- bgcolor="#ffcccc"
| 79
| April 10
| Houston
| 
| Kelenna Azubuike (32)
| Andris Biedriņš (7)
| C. J. Watson (9)
| Oracle Arena19,596
| 28–51
|- bgcolor="#bbffbb"
| 80
| April 11
| @ Utah
| 
| C. J. Watson (38)
| Andris Biedriņš (9)
| C. J. Watson (9)
| EnergySolutions Arena19,911
| 29–51
|- bgcolor="#ffcccc"
| 81
| April 13
| San Antonio
| 
| Anthony Randolph (24)
| Anthony Randolph (16)
| Anthony Randolph (4)
| Oracle Arena19,596
| 29–52
|- bgcolor="#ffcccc"
| 82
| April 15
| @ Phoenix
| 
| Anthony Morrow (33)
| Anthony Morrow (12)
| C. J. Watson (12)
| US Airways Center18,422
| 29–53

Roster

Transactions

Trades

Free agency

Re-signed

Additions

Subtractions

References

Golden State Warriors seasons
Golden State Warriors
Golden State Warriors
Golden State Warriors